Ndambuki is a surname. Notable people with the surname include:

 Angela Ndambuki (born 1979), Kenyan lawyer and corporate executive
 Daniel Ndambuki (born 1977), Kenyan comedian
 Gideon Musyoka Ndambuki (born 1947), Kenyan politician

Surnames of Kenyan origin